James Arthur Higgs-Walker (31 July 1892 – 3 September 1979) was an English first-class cricketer who played in two matches for Worcestershire, one each side of the First World War.

His first match, and only County Championship appearance, came against Gloucestershire at Cheltenham in August 1913, though he had something of a nightmare debut: he made 0 and 0* with the bat, conceded 20 runs from two wicketless overs, and did not hold a catch.

After the war he appeared once more, against Warwickshire in one of the friendly games Worcestershire played in 1919 (the county did not return to Championship cricket until the following season). This time he made a rather better fist of things, scoring 44 in his only innings and taking the only wicket of his career when he bowled Warwickshire's number ten Ernest Suckling.

He taught history at Oundle School after the War, where he later became a housemaster.  In 1925 Higgs-Walker was appointed headmaster of Sevenoaks School, a post in which he remained until 1954.

Higgs-Walker was born at Wychbury House, Clent, Worcestershire; he died aged 87 in Midhurst, Sussex.

External links
 

1892 births
1979 deaths
English cricketers
Worcestershire cricketers